Matthew Rowell may refer to: 

Matthew Rowell (Australian footballer) (born 2001), Australian rules footballer
Matthew Rowell (South African footballer) (born 1993), South African footballer (soccer player)